Hope Island is the northern of three islands in south eastern Georgian Bay, of Lake Huron, in the Canadian province of Ontario. It has an elevation of 187 meters (613 feet) above sea level and is currently uninhabited and not presently slated for development. It was named by Henry Bayfield after he surveyed it in the 19th century.  Like its neighbours, Beckwith Island and Christian Island, the uninhabited island is part of the Beausoleil First Nation.

Hope Island Lighthouse
In 1884, a lighthouse was placed on the northwest side of the island. Despite this there are a number of wreck sites off the island.

References

Islands of Georgian Bay
Uninhabited islands of Ontario